Mount Gerdel is a mountain,  high, standing  southeast of Mount Andrews at the south side of Albanus Glacier, Antarctica. It was mapped by the United States Geological Survey from ground surveys and U.S. Navy air photos, 1960–63, and was named by the Advisory Committee on Antarctic Names for Lieutenant David H. Gerdel, U.S. Navy, of the Byrd Station winter party, 1965.

References

Mountains of Marie Byrd Land